Aleksandra Cvetićanin (born ) is a Serbian volleyball player. She is part of the Serbia women's national volleyball team.

She participated in the 2015 FIVB Volleyball World Grand Prix.
On club level she played for NIS Spartak Subotica in 2015.

References

External links
 http://www.scoresway.com/?sport=volleyball&page=player&id=8198 
 
 Aleksandra Cveticanin at the International Volleyball Federation
 

1993 births
Living people
Serbian women's volleyball players
Place of birth missing (living people)
Serbian expatriate sportspeople in Romania
21st-century Serbian women